The Season of the Harvest or Low Water was the third and final season of the lunar and civil Egyptian calendars. It fell after the Season of the Emergence and before the spiritually dangerous intercalary month, after which the New Year's festivities began the Season of the Inundation (Ꜣḫt). In the modern Coptic calendar it falls between Tobi 11 and Paoni 11.

Names
The Season of the Harvest was known to the Egyptians themselves as "LowWater", variously transliterated as Shemu or Shomu, in reference to the state of the Nile before the beginning of its annual flood.

It is also referred to as Summer or the Dry Season.

Lunar calendar
In the lunar calendar, the intercalary month was added as needed to maintain the heliacal rising of Sirius in the fourth month of this season. This meant that the Season of the Harvest usually lasted from May to September. Because the precise timing of the flood varied, the months of "Low Water" no longer precisely reflected the state of the river but the season was usually the time for the collection of Egypt's grain harvest.

Civil calendar
In the civil calendar, the lack of leap years into the Ptolemaic and Roman periods meant the season lost about one day every four years and was not stable relative to the solar year or Gregorian calendar.

Months
The Season of the Harvest was divided into four months. In the lunar calendar, each began on a dawn when the waning crescent moon was no longer visible. In the civil calendar, each consisted of exactly 30 days divided into three 10-day weeks known as decans.

In ancient Egypt, these months were usually recorded by their number within the season: I, II, III, and IV Šmw. They were also known by the names of their principal festivals, which came to be increasingly used after the Persian occupation. These then became the basis for the names of the months of the Coptic calendar.

See also
 Egyptian & Coptic calendars
 Egyptian units of time
 Sham el-Nessim
 Temple of Kom Ombo

Notes

References

Egyptian calendar